The Hobbit is a 1977 American animated musical television special created by Rankin/Bass, a studio known for their holiday specials, and animated by Topcraft, a precursor to Studio Ghibli. The film is an adaptation of the 1937 book of the same name by J. R. R. Tolkien, and was first broadcast on NBC in the United States on Sunday, November 27, 1977.

Plot

A Hobbit named Bilbo Baggins lives in his hobbit-hole. The wizard Gandalf informs him he is looking for someone to share an adventure, and introduces thirteen dwarves led by Thorin Oakenshield. They invite themselves in, eat dinner, and play music. The magic in the music makes Bilbo suddenly long for adventure.

Thorin explains Bilbo is to be a lucky number fourteen for them, and tells how his dwarves were driven out of the Lonely Mountain by the dragon Smaug, who stole their treasure. Gandalf accepts the mission before the Hobbit can speak.

The company discovers a camp of three trolls, who capture all but Gandalf and Bilbo. Bilbo hides while Gandalf uses his magic to bring the sunrise, which turns the trolls to stone. In the troll's cave, Bilbo discovers some stolen treasure, which the dwarves claim. They find two swords, and a dagger for Bilbo.

Gandalf shows Thorin a map of the Lonely Mountain and a key, given to him by Thorin's father. The map shows a secret passage.

Travelling through the Misty Mountains, all but Gandalf are captured by goblins. Gandalf kills the Great Goblin, and the dwarves escape. Bilbo loses the group; he finds an underground lake, where he discovers a ring, and meets the monster Gollum, who hunts him. Bilbo, discovering the ring grants invisibility, follows Gollum to the door, and escapes.

The goblins, riding Wargs, pursue the company into a pine forest, setting it ablaze. The Lord of the Eagles rescues the company, and carries them to Mirkwood; Gandalf leaves. Bilbo and the dwarves are captured by giant spiders, but Bilbo puts on his ring and drives off the spiders with his dagger. The dwarves are apprehended by the wood elves. Bilbo escapes using his ring. After weeks of searching, Bilbo pilfers a sleeping guard's keys, and floats the dwarves in barrels down the river into Laketown.

The people of Laketown nurse the company back to health. The fourteen reach the Lonely Mountain, and follow the map's instructions to enter. Bilbo goes in first, and meets Smaug, using the ring to hide. He and Smaug converse; the dragon assumes Bilbo must be a Laketowner. Bilbo discovers a patch of skin on Smaug not covered by protective scales. When Smaug attacks him for stealing, he escapes, mocking the dragon. In a rage, Smaug flies off to take revenge on Laketown. Bilbo sends a thrush to tell Bard about the bare patch, and Bard shoots Smaug with his family's black arrow. Smaug destroys Laketown in his death throes.

The Dwarves reclaim their treasure, only to find that the Lakemen and the Elves have arrived, wanting recompense for Smaug's many damages over the years. Thorin refuses to share, and declares war. Bilbo rebukes him, as they are outnumbered; Thorin is angered. Thorin's cousin, Dain, brings more dwarves. Gandalf arrives, warning that the Goblins are coming. Men, elves, and dwarves unite, and Bilbo uses his ring to hide as battle rages. The Eagles join the fight.

Bilbo finds a wounded Bombur, who informs him that the battle has been won. Only seven of the thirteen dwarves are left, and is led by Gandalf to the dying Thorin, who forgives him. Bilbo accepts two small chests of gold and his dagger as payment. Gandalf escorts him home. Gandalf warns him that the adventure is only just beginning, thanks to the ring he has found.

Voice cast
The voice actors for the characters were:

 Orson Bean – Bilbo Baggins
 Richard Boone – Smaug
 Hans Conried – Thorin Oakenshield
 John Huston – Gandalf / Narrator
 Otto Preminger – Thranduil
 Cyril Ritchard – Elrond
 Brother Theodore – Gollum
 Paul Frees – Bombur, Troll #1
 Jack DeLeon – Dwalin, Fíli, Kíli, Óin, Glóin, Ori, Nori, Bifur, Bofur, Troll #2
 Don Messick – Balin, Goblin, Lord of the Eagles, Troll #3
 John Stephenson – Dori, Bard, Great Goblin
 Glenn Yarbrough – The Balladeer
 Thurl Ravenscroft – Goblin (singing voice), Background voice

Production
The film was produced and directed by Arthur Rankin Jr. and Jules Bass of Rankin/Bass Productions in New York City, and was adapted for the screen by Romeo Muller, with Rankin taking on the additional duties of production designer. When interviewed for the film, Rankin declared that he would add nothing to the story that wasn't in the original.  The New York Times reported that The Hobbit cost $3 million to produce.

In a 2003 interview, Rankin stated, "I love the Tolkien work," and explained that he was able to make the film because The Hobbit was still in the public domain at the time, despite claims to the contrary from the copyright holders.

The story's protagonist, Bilbo Baggins, is voiced by Orson Bean, backed up by noted Hollywood director and actor John Huston as the voice of Gandalf. In supporting roles, the comedian and performance artist Brother Theodore was chosen for the voice of Gollum, and Thurl Ravenscroft performed the baritone singing voices of the goblins. The gravelly voice of the dragon Smaug was provided by Richard Boone, with Hans Conried as Thorin Oakenshield, rounding out the cast of primarily American voice actors. The film was the final Rankin/Bass project to star the Australian actor Cyril Ritchard, here playing the voice of Elrond.

The Hobbit was animated by Topcraft in Tokyo, a now-defunct Japanese animation studio whose animation team re-formed as Studio Ghibli under Hayao Miyazaki, while some of the animators went to establish Pacific Animation Corporation. Topcraft successfully partnered with Rankin/Bass on several other productions in traditional animation, including 'Twas the Night Before Christmas (1974), The Stingiest Man in Town (1978) and The Last Unicorn (1982). According to Rankin, the visual style of the film took its basic cue from the early illustrations of Arthur Rackham.

While Topcraft produced the animation overseas, the concept artwork was completed at the Rankin/Bass studio under the direction of Arthur Rankin. Rhode Island artist Lester Abrams did the initial designs for most of the characters; Rankin had seen Abrams' illustrations to an excerpt from The Hobbit in Children's Digest. Principal artists included coordinating animator Toru Hara; supervising animator/character designer Tsuguyuki Kubo; character and effects animators Hidetoshi Kaneko and Kazuko Ito; and background designer Minoru Nishida. The same studio and crew members were also used for The Return of the King.

Harry N. Abrams published a large, illustrated coffee table edition of the book featuring concept art and stills.

Jules Bass primarily adapted Tolkien's original lyrics for the film's musical interludes, drawn primarily from the songs that feature prominently in the book. He also assisted Maury Laws, Rankin/Bass's composer and conductor-in-residence, in the composition of an original theme song, "The Greatest Adventure (The Ballad of the Hobbit)", sung by Glenn Yarbrough as the sole original song written for the film. This folk ballad came to be associated with Yarbrough, who reprised it in the soundtrack to 1980 animated film The Return of the King.

Critical reception
In 1978, Romeo Muller won a Peabody Award for his teleplay for The Hobbit. The film was also nominated for the Hugo Award for Best Dramatic Presentation, but lost to Star Wars. A few days before its first airing, John J. O'Connor wrote in The New York Times that "Rankin and Bass Productions have now carefully translated The Hobbit into film. The result is curiously eclectic, but filled with nicely effective moments. … The drawings frequently suggest strong resemblances to non-Tolkien characters… The goblins could have stepped out of a Maurice Sendak book. But … the Dragon and Gollum the riddle aficionado bring some clever original touches… Whatever its flaws, this television version of The Hobbit warrants attention."

Criticism primarily focused on adaptation issues, including the unfamiliar style of artwork used by the Japanese-American co-production team, whereas some Tolkien fans questioned the appropriateness of repackaging the material as a family film for a very young audience. Douglas A. Anderson, a Tolkien scholar, called the adaptation "execrable" in his own introduction to The Annotated Hobbit, although he did not elaborate; and a few critics said it was confusing for those not already familiar with the plot.  The author Baird Searles criticized the adaptation, calling it an "abomination" and an attempt that had "failed miserably". He singled out the quality of animation, the omission of key plot points such as Beorn and the Arkenstone, and the soundtrack.

IGN gave the film 7 out of 10 recommending it to fans of the novel. The review aggregation website Rotten Tomatoes gives the film a score of 69% based on reviews from 16 critics.

Sequel
Before The Hobbit aired on NBC, Rankin/Bass and its partner animation houses were preparing a sequel.  Meanwhile, United Artists released J.R.R. Tolkien's The Lord of the Rings in 1978, an animated adaptation directed by Ralph Bakshi, originally intended as the first part in a two-part film. United Artists's sequel would soon be  cancelled after a disagreement with Bakshi.

Taking elements from the last volume of The Lord of the Rings, they developed the musical The Return of the King, featuring most of the voice artists and production team as The Hobbit. The Return of the King used a framing device in which both The Hobbit and The Return of the King begin and end with Bilbo's stay at Rivendell.

The Return of the King is often mistaken as a sequel to Bakshi's The Lord of the Rings. After Rankin/Bass became defunct in 1987, Warner Bros. acquired the rights to King for home video distribution and chose to market the film, along with The Hobbit, as instalments of an animated Tolkien trilogy, with The Lord of the Rings (by then also owned by Warner Bros., from United Artists) acting as the middle chapter. This false promotion led to rumours that Rankin/Bass had originally decided to produce The Return of the King upon hearing that Bakshi's sequel to The Lord of the Rings had been cancelled. However, Rankin/Bass had always planned on making The Return of the King as a follow-up to their production of The Hobbit, even before the release of Bakshi's film.

Release
The Hobbit first aired as an animated television special in 1977 with the goal of producing an accompanying tie-in storybook and song recordings for children, as in other Rankin/Bass productions.

The Hobbit was released on LP with the soundtrack and dialogue from the film was also released in 1977 by Disney through its Buena Vista Records label, and an edited version, along with accompanying "storyteller read-alongs", was later issued for the Mouse Factory's Disneyland Records imprint. A second music album by Glenn Yarbrough of music "inspired" by The Hobbit  was also released.

The Hobbit was released by ABC Video Enterprises in the early 1980s on Betamax and VHS by Sony, and CED by RCA. Warner Home Video released the film on VHS in 1991, again in 1996 (as part of the Warner Bros. Classic Tales VHS line), and on DVD in 2001 (through Warner Bros. Family Entertainment). Parade Video released the film on DVD and VHS in 2004. The earlier 1980s and 1990s videocassette releases contain sound effects that were edited out of the 2001 DVD without explanation.

The film was also released on DVD by Warner Bros. as part of the DVD trilogy boxed set, which includes Ralph Bakshi's The Lord of the Rings and the Rankin Bass production of The Return of the King. A remastered deluxe edition DVD was released on July 22, 2014. Sound effects missing in previous DVD releases are absent from this release as well.

See also

 The Hobbit film series (live action)
 The Last Unicorn (film)
 List of animated feature films
 The Hobbit (1967 film) a short film by Gene Deitch
 The Hobbit (1985 film) a USSR film

Notes

References

External links

 

1977 films
1977 animated films
1977 in American television
1977 television films
1977 television specials
1970s American animated films
1970s fantasy films
American animated fantasy films
1970s animated television specials
1970s children's fantasy films
Films scored by Maury Laws
Films about dwarfs
Films about elves
Animated films based on children's books
Television shows directed by Jules Bass
Television shows directed by Arthur Rankin Jr.
Television shows written by Romeo Muller
Musical television specials
NBC television specials
Peabody Award-winning broadcasts
Television shows based on British novels
Films based on The Hobbit
Topcraft
Japanese animated fantasy films
Rankin/Bass Productions films
Animated films about dragons
1970s American television specials
1970s children's animated films
Anime films based on novels